This is a list of technical colleges in Saudi Arabia that are governed by the Technical and Vocational Training Corporation (TVTC).

Technical colleges 

 Ahsa Technical College
 Al-Rass Technical College
 Arar Technical College
 Baha Technical College
 Bisha Technical College
Buraidah Technical College
Dammam Technical College
 Dwadmi Technical College
Food & Environment College in Buraidah
 Gurayat College of Technology
Hafr Al-Batin Technical College
 Hail Technical College
 Jeddah College of Telecom & Electronics
Jeddah Technical College
 Jouf Technical College
 Khamis Mushait Technical College
 Kharj Technical College
 Madinah College of Tourism & Hospitality
Madinah Technical College
 Majmaah Technical College
 Makkah Technical College
 Najran Technical College
 Qatif Technical College
 Qunfudah Technical College
 Quwaiya Technical College
 Riyadh College of Telecom & Information
Riyadh Technical College
 Tabuk Technical College
 Taif Technical College
 Unaizah Technical College
 Wadi Addawasir Technical College
 Yanbu Technical College
 Zulfi Technical College
 Saudi Mining Polytechnic

See also 

Technical and Vocational Training Corporation

References 

Saudi Arabia education-related lists
Saudi Arabia